Anuradha Sriram (9 July 1970) is an Indian Carnatic vocalist and film playback singer. Best known for her work in South Indian filmsalso worked in a few projects in other Indian language and Sinhala films. Anuradha has recorded over 4000 songs. She has also recorded songs for many non-film albums, tele-series, devotionals and classical collaborations.

Anuradha debuted as a singer with the group song "Malarodu Malaringu" composed by A. R. Rahman for the film Bombay (1995). However, she shot to fame with her solo song "Anbendra Mazhayile" from the film Minsara Kanavu (1997), again composed by A. R. Rahman. Since then, Anuradha has recorded thousands of film songs for various prominent South Indian music composers such as Ilaiyaraja, Vidyasagar, Deva, Anu Malik, M. M. Keeravani, Sirpy, Hamsalekha, Ouseppachan, Mani Sharma, Koti, Mohan Sithara, Yuvan Shankar Raja, Harris Jayaraj and others.

Recorded film songs 
Anuradha has sung over 4000 songs in Tamil, Sinhala, Kannada, Hindi, Bengali, Telugu and Malayalam.

Tamil film songs

1990s

2000s

2010s

2020s

Telugu songs

1990s

2000s

2010–present

Kannada songs

Malayalam songs

Hindi songs

Bengali songs

Non-film songs

Albums

Serial songs

References

Lists of songs recorded by Indian singers